Burning Sands (Hebrew:Kholot lohatot) is a 1960 German-Israeli adventure film.

History
The movie was directed by Raphael Nussbaum,  starring Daliah Lavi, Gert Günther Hoffmann and Abraham Eisenberg. It was the first German-Israeli feature film.

Cast
 Daliah Lavi
 Gert Günther Hoffmann
 Abraham Eisenberg
 Uri Zohar
 Oded Kotler
 Gila Almagor
 Natan Cogan
 Abraham Barzilai
 Hillel Ne'eman
 Abraham Ronai
 Abi Ofarim (musician)
 Esther Ofarim (musician)

See also
 Garden of Evil
Cinema of Israel

References

External links 
 

1960 films
1960s adventure drama films
German adventure drama films
Israeli adventure drama films
West German films
1960s German-language films
Films set in Jordan
Treasure hunt films
1960 drama films
Films directed by Raphael Nussbaum
1960s German films